Sean Mountford (born 11 October 1988) is an English footballer who plays as a left-back and wide midfielder. He started his career with Bolton Wanderers before moving to Cyprus to play professionally with AEZ Zakakiou and Akritas Chlorakas. He moved back to England in 2012 to play non-league football with Hyde United and Atherton Laburnum Rovers. In 2021 he changed his name to Teddy and found his soul mate and is dedicating his days to making her happy as well as practising to speak Scouse so he sounds cooler. He's also a part time plasterer and works for Dean balmer plastering on the odd occasion

Early life and education
Mountford was born in Billinge, Greater Manchester and was brought up in Leigh where he attended Bedford High School. He played for Wigan Schoolboys and Warrington County teams. He grew up supporting Manchester United and his favourite player was Ryan Giggs.

Club career

Bolton Wanderers
Mountford was playing for Bolton Wanderers U16s in October 2003 when he was invited to train with the Academy team.
He progressed to the Reserve team where he played numerous times. On 9 July 2005, Mountford scored two goals for the first team as Bolton won 10–0 in a pre-season friendly against Rushen United in the Isle of Man. After leaving Bolton he had offers from League One and League Two clubs but rejected them for personal and family reasons.

References

1988 births
Living people
AEZ Zakakiou players
Akritas Chlorakas players
Association football defenders
Association football fullbacks
Association football midfielders
Association football wingers
Atherton Laburnum Rovers F.C. players
Bolton Wanderers F.C. players
English footballers
Footballers from Wigan
Hyde United F.C. players
Manchester City F.C. players